Rosaldo is a surname. Notable people with the surname include:

Alessandra Rosaldo (born 1971), Mexican actress, singer, and dancer
Anthony Rosaldo (born 1994), Filipino singer, actor, host and model
Michelle Rosaldo (1944–1981), American anthropologist
Michelle Rosaldo Book Prize, an award ceremony in honor of her
Renato Rosaldo (born 1941), American anthropologist
Sergio Ramírez Rosaldo (born 1979), Mexican footballer and manager

Spanish-language surnames